Axel Temataua (born 29 August 1980) is a Tahitian footballer who plays for AS Manu-Ura, as a striker.

Club career
Temataua began his career with AS Manu-Ura, joining the club in 2003.

International career
On 10 May 2004, Temataua made his debut for Tahiti in a 2–0 win against the Cook Islands, scoring two minutes into the game.

International goals
Scores and results list Tahiti's goal tally first.

References

1980 births
Living people
People from Tahiti
French Polynesian footballers
Tahiti international footballers
Association football forwards
2004 OFC Nations Cup players